Douglas Hall may refer to:
Douglas Kent Hall (1938–2008), American writer and photographer
Sir Douglas Hall, 1st Baronet (1866–1923), member of parliament for the Isle of Wight
Sir Douglas Hall, 14th Baronet (1909–2004), British colonial administrator
Douglas John Hall (born 1928), Canadian Christian minister and theologian
Dougie Hall (born 1980), Scottish rugby union player
Doug Hall (artist), American photographer and media artist
Doug Hall (inventor), American author and inventor